Gradišče is a settlement in the Haloze Hills in the Municipality of Videm in eastern Slovenia, next to the border with Croatia. The area traditionally belonged to the Styria region. It is now included in the Drava Statistical Region.

References

External links
Gradišče on Geopedia

Populated places in the Municipality of Videm